Kwes Darko (born Kwesi Darko) is a British music composer/producer from London, England, signed to Young Songs.

Kwes Darko’s first major exposure as a musician came in 2009, through his debut track, entitled "Space Ex", under the moniker “Blue Daisy”, the track featured French singer LaNote and was named 'Best New Track' on Pitchfork.com. He released his debut album, The Sunday Gift in September 2011 to favourable reviews from Resident Advisor and Pitchfork Media. His mixes have been featured in Fact and Dazed & Confused.

Discography
Space Ex, Black Acre (2009)
Strings Detached EP, Black Acre (2009)
Blue Daisy vs TOKiMONSTA - USD / Free Dem, Team Acre (2010)
Blue Daisy & Anneka - Raindrops EP, Black Acre (2010)
3rd Degree EP, Black Acre (2011)
The Sunday Gift, Black Acre (2011)
Blue Daisy X Unknown Shapes - Bedtime Stories EP, Black Acre (2012)
Blue Daisy Presents Dahlia Black - "Fuck A Rap Song" (2013)
Blue Daisy X Unknown Shapes - Used to Give a Fuck EP, Black Acre (2013)
Tricky ft Blue Daisy - My Palestine girl ‘single, False Idols (2014)
Blue Daisy - Psychotic love EP, 37 Adventures (2014)
Blue Daisy - Darker Than Blue, R&S Records (2015)
Connie Constance - In the grass EP, Black Acre (2015)
Connie Constance - Answer, Black Acre (2015)
Stateless - Sixfold symmetry EP, Stateless (2015)
Sampa the great - Birds and the BEE9 ‘LP, Big Dada (2017) 
slowthai - Murder, Bone soda (2017)
slowthai - I wish i knew EP, Bone Soda (2017)
slowthai - The bottom/North Nights, Method (2018)
Harve - Caught up ‘single, Toyitoyi (2018)
Harve - reAD ‘single, Toyitoyi (2018)
Harve - City scapes ‘single, Toyitoyi (2018)
slowthai - Ladies ‘single, Method (2018)
slowthai - Polaroid ‘single, Method (2018)
slowthai - Drug dealer ‘single, Method (2018)
slowthai - Runt EP , Method (2018)
slowthai - Rainbow ‘single, Method (2018)
slowthai - Nothing great about Britain ‘LP, Method (2019)
slowthai x Denzel Curry - Psycho ‘single, Toyitoyi (2019)
Sampa the great - OMG ‘single, Ninja tune (2019) 
Meekz - Rap aside ‘single, ADA (2019)
SL x Pa Salieu-  Hit the block ‘single, Virgin EMI (2020)
Footsie ft JME - Pepper stew ‘single, Studio55 (2020)
Harve - Held by the moon ‘EP , Mostly at night (2020
slowthai - Enemy ‘single, Method (2020)

References

External links
 Blue Daisy's Soundcloud

English electronic musicians
Musicians from London
Living people
Year of birth missing (living people)